Riders of the Cactus is a 1931 American Western film directed by David Kirkland and starring Hal Taliaferro, Buzz Barton and Fred Church. Location shooting took place in Sonora, California, and near Tucson, Arizona at the Tanque Verde Ranch and Mission San Xavier del Bac Mission. The film was made back-to-back with Flying Lariats.

Cast
 Hal Taliaferro as Bob Bronson
 Buzz Barton as Buzz
 Fred Church as Jake McKeever, alias Jake Wenzel
 Lorraine LaVal as Josie
 Ed Cartwright as Pete
 Don Wilson as Peon
 Joe Lawliss as Bill
 Tete Brady as Hattie McKeever
 Etta Delmas as Aunt Sarah Casey
 Gus Anderson as Ranger Captain
 Sam Garrett as Trick Roper / Ranger

Plot
Smugglers on the Mexico–United States border pursue the tourist Josie after they learn that she has a valuable map that shows the location of buried treasure. Bronson rescues her, catching and beating the villains. Agents from the U.S. Border Patrol take the villains away, and Bronson and Josie turn the treasure over to a mission church where they are married.

References

Bibliography
 Michael R. Pitts. Poverty Row Studios, 1929–1940: An Illustrated History of 55 Independent Film Companies, with a Filmography for Each. McFarland & Company, 2005.

External links
 

1931 films
1931 Western (genre) films
American Western (genre) films
Films shot in Arizona
Films shot in Tucson, Arizona
Films directed by David Kirkland
1930s English-language films
1930s American films